Francis Clay (November 16, 1923 – January 21, 2008), was an American jazz and blues drummer, best known for his work behind Muddy Waters in the 1950s and 1960s, and as an original member of the James Cotton band. Clay's jazz-influenced style is cited as an influence by many of the British Invasion rock 'n' rollers of the 1960s such as Charlie Watts and Ronnie Wood of the Rolling Stones and Faces, respectively.

Born and raised in Rock Island, Illinois, he started playing jazz, professionally at the age of 15, played drums behind many of the biggest names of 20th century popular American music.

In his career, Clay claimed to have backed Gypsy Rose Lee, and played with Jay McShann and Charlie Parker early on and with Jimi Hendrix while in New York's Greenwich Village. He can be heard on recordings including John Lee Hooker's Live at the Cafe Au Go-Go and can be seen and heard on documents from the Waters band's 1960 Newport Jazz Festival appearance, and on albums issued by the Arhoolie label by Big Mama Thornton and Lightning Hopkins, among many others.

Clay made his home in San Francisco in the late 1960s and became a part of the music scene in the Bay Area throughout the rest of his life. His birthday parties at the Biscuits and Blues nightclub were an annual gathering of the tribe, and he was known also as "the ambassador" at the annual San Francisco Blues Festival, where he was the subject of a tribute in 2007, and mourned in 2008.

Clay claimed to have been deprived of recognition for his compositional contributions to the Waters oeuvre. Songs he claimed to have composed and/or arranged included "Walking in the Park," "She's Nineteen Years Old" and "Tiger in Your Hole."

Discography

With John Lee Hooker
Live at Cafe Au Go Go (BluesWay, 1967)
With Lightnin' Hopkins
Lightnin'! (Poppy, 1969)
In the Key of Lightnin' (Tomato, 1969 [2002])
Lightning Hopkins in Berkeley (Arhoolie, 1969 [1972])
With Jimmy Rogers
Jimmy Rogers (Chess, 1950–60)
With Otis Spann
The Blues Is Where It's At (BluesWay, 1966)
With Muddy Waters
Muddy Waters Sings "Big Bill" (Chess, 1960)
At Newport 1960 (Chess, 1960)
Folk Singer (Chess, 1964)

References

Bibliography
Ronnie, by Ronnie Wood, St. Martin's Griffin, 2008

1923 births
2008 deaths
People from Rock Island, Illinois
American jazz musicians
20th-century American musicians
American blues drummers
Jazz musicians from Illinois